Robert Hughes (5 September 1892 – 1955) was an English professional footballer who played in the Football League as an outside forward, most notably for Rochdale, Wigan Borough and Hull City. He scored more than 100 goals in his career and represented the Southern League versus the Football League XI in 1915.

Honours 
Wigan Borough
 Manchester Senior Cup: 1929–30

Career statistics

References

1892 births
English footballers
English Football League players
Brentford F.C. players
Association football outside forwards
Northampton Town F.C. players
Hull City A.F.C. players
People from Pelaw
Footballers from Tyne and Wear
Sheffield United F.C. players
Rochdale A.F.C. players
Wigan Borough F.C. players
Southern Football League players
1955 deaths
Ashton National F.C. players
Southern Football League representative players
Leeds City F.C. wartime guest players
Manchester United F.C. wartime guest players